171 Puppis (171 Pup) is a triple star system in the constellation of Puppis – the stern of Argo Navis – of apparent magnitude +5.38. Lacking a Bayer designation, it is instead known by its Gould designation. Based upon parallax measurements, the system is 49.6 light years away from the Solar System.

The inner pair form a spectroscopic binary with an orbital period of around 10 years. In 2011, they had an angular separation of  along a position angle of 72.1°. There is a common proper motion companion, Van Biesbroeck 3 or WD 0743–340, at an angular separation of 869.65″ along a position angle of 2.81° from the inner pair. This is a white dwarf star with a classification of DC11.0 and a temperature of 4,600 K, making it one of the coolest white dwarfs known.

References

F-type main-sequence stars
Puppis
Puppis, 171
Durchmusterung objects
037853
3018
063077
0288
Triple star systems